Henri Schwery (14 June 1932 – 7 January 2021) was a Swiss prelate of the Catholic Church who was Bishop of Sion from 1977 to 1995. He was raised to the rank of cardinal in 1991.

Early life and ordination
Born in St-Léonard, Valais, Schwery studied mathematics, theoretical physics, Catholic theology, and philosophy in Sion, Rome, and Fribourg. On 7 July 1957 he was ordained a priest.

Professor and bishop
From 1961 to 1977, Schwery was part of the theological faculty of Sion, which he headed from 1972 to 1977.

Pope Paul VI appointed Schwery the Bishop of Sion on 22 July 1977. On 17 September 1977, he was consecrated a bishop by his predecessor as Bishop of Sion, François-Nestor Adam. He was president of the Swiss Bishops Conference from 1983 to 1988.

In his diocese in June 1988, Archbishop Marcel Lefebvre consecrated four bishops without papal approval. Schwery called for church unity in the face of that schism.

Cardinal
On 28 June 1991, Pope John Paul II named Schwery a member of the College of Cardinals, assigning him as a cardinal-priest to Santi Protomartiri a Via Aurelia Antica. On 25 July 1991, Pope John Paul made him a member of the Congregation for Divine Worship and the Congregation for the Clergy.

During March of that year, he paid his respects when Lefebvre died, making a quiet visit to pray over his body alongside the Apostolic Nuncio to Switzerland Edoardo Rovida.

Pope John Paul accepted his resignation as Bishop of Sion on 1 April 1995 when he was 62. He had submitted his resignation citing health problems. Schwery was one of the cardinal electors who participated in the 2005 papal conclave that elected Pope Benedict XVI.

He died at a retirement home in St-Léonard on 7 January 2021.

References

External links
 

1932 births
2021 deaths
People from Sierre District
Swiss cardinals
20th-century Roman Catholic bishops in Switzerland
Cardinals created by Pope John Paul II
Roman Catholic Diocese of Sion